Henry Doelger (pronounced DOLE-jer) (June 23, 1896, San Francisco – July 23, 1978) was a San Francisco developer known for the creation of large low-cost housing tracts in San Francisco and Daly City.

Biography
Doelger was born behind his parents' bakery in San Francisco. After his father's death when he was 12 years old, Doelger left school in the 8th grade in order to help support his family. Henry Doelger went into business with his two brothers Frank and John Jr, eventually becoming a major real estate developer in San Francisco.

During the 1940s, Doelger built large sections of San Francisco's Sunset District, in the same part of the city where he had set up his headquarters since the 1930s. The 1932 art deco "Doelger Building" on Judah Street was designated in 2013 as an official landmark by the City of San Francisco.  In 1947, Doelger and his associates started building what is now known as the Westlake district in Daly City. This is one of the earliest examples of a large-tract suburb and manifestation of urban sprawl.  Life Magazine featured photographs of the numerous rows of houses in the 1950s, which were immortalized in the song Little Boxes.

Henry Doelger died on July 23, 1978, at the age of 82.

References

Books and articles
 Brechin, Gray. (1990). "Mr. Levitt of the Sunset". San Francisco Focus, June 23, 1990.
 Keil, Rob. (2006). Little Boxes: The Architecture of a Classic Midcentury Suburb. Daly City, CA: Advection Media. .

External links 
"Visionary's 'ticky-tacky' landmarks" by Ken Garcia, San Francisco Chronicle, October 15, 2002.
"Praising San Francisco's Champion of Conformity" by Patricia Leigh Brown, New York Times, January 29, 2003.
"Profile: Builder Henry Doelger" by Rob Keil, Daly City History Online (website), 2005, at the Wayback Machine (archived February 2, 2005)
"Streetwise: Doelger City" by Steve LaBounty, Western Neighborhoods Project (website), November 1999.
"The Changing Physical Landscape of the Sunset District: The Late 1800s through the Mid-1900s" by Lorri Ungaretti, Encyclopedia of San Francisco (website), 2004.
Westlake Resource

American real estate businesspeople
Businesspeople from San Francisco
20th-century American businesspeople
1896 births
1979 deaths
Sunset District, San Francisco
Daly City, California
Architecture in the San Francisco Bay Area